Laurence Gardner (17 May 1943 – 12 August 2010) was a British author and lecturer. He wrote on religious fringe theories such as the Jesus bloodline.

Biography
Laurence Gardner was born in Hackney, London. He was married to Angela and they had one child together and two children from a previous marriage. He was a stockbroker before becoming an author. Gardner was also an artistic painter, working alone and with Canadian artist Peter Robson, and was also known in the United States for his radio telephone-ins. 

Gardner's first book Bloodline of the Holy Grail was published during 1996. The book was serialized in The Daily Mail and was a best seller. He used his books to propose several theories, including a belief that Jesus and Mary Magdalene had married and had children, whose descendants included King Arthur and the House of Stuart. In Lost Secrets of the Sacred Ark he claimed that the Ark of the Covenant was a machine for manufacturing "monatomic gold" – a supposed elixir which could be used to extend life. His books also included theories about Freemasonry, the Knights Templar, the Holy Grail, and proposed connections between Atenism and Judaism. 

Gardner referred to himself as "Chevalier Labhran de Saint Germain", and "Presidential Attaché to the European Council of Princes" (the existence of which cannot be verified) also "Prior of the Celtic Churches Sacred Kindred of Saint Columba". He also claimed to be Jacobite Historiographer Royal of the Royal House of Stewart. He was an endorser of Michel Roger Lafosse, in particular his claims to be descended from the House of Stuart, which Gardner claimed was descended from Jesus Christ. Historians and scholars regard him as a conspiracy theorist, and treat his work as pseudohistory. Lafosse's claims have been dismissed.

Gardner was interviewed for the 2013 Killing Joke music documentary film, The Death and Resurrection Show, in which he stated that, "The Christian God is an Extraterrestrial".

Gardner died on 12 August 2010 after a prolonged illness. His book, The Origin of God, was published in 2010 as a print on demand book from the Dash House Publishing Company, established by his widow. It is described as "a biographical exploration of the deiform character variously known as Yahweh, Allah, or simply The Lord. It seeks to uncover and evaluate his original identity...". His final book Revelation of the Devil, a companion to The Origin of God, was published by Dash in 2012.

Bibliography
Bloodline of The Holy Grail: The Hidden Lineage of Jesus Revealed (1996)
Genesis of the Grail Kings: The Astonishing Story of the Ancient Bloodline of Christ and the True Heritage of the Holy Grail (1999)
Illustrated Bloodline of the Holy Grail (2000)
 Bloodline of The Holy Grail: The Hidden Lineage of Jesus Revealed, Author's Special Edition (2001)
Realm of The Ring Lords: The Ancient Legacy of the Ring and the Grail  (2003)
Lost Secrets of the Sacred Ark: Amazing Revelations of the Incredible Power of Gold (2004)
The Magdalene Legacy: The Jesus and Mary Bloodline Conspiracy (2005)
The Shadow of Solomon: The Lost Secret of the Freemasons Revealed (2005)
The Grail Enigma: The Hidden Heirs of Jesus and Mary Magdalene (2008)
The Origin of God (2010)
 Revelation of the Devil (2012)

References

External links
A lecture based on Lost Secrets of the Sacred Ark /broken link/
Obituary in The Independent
Laurence Gardner interviewed in The Death and Resurrection Show
Laurence Gardner lecture "Bloodline of the Holy Grail" Oct 31, 1997 part 1Laurence Gardner lecture "Bloodline of the Holy Grail" Oct 31, 1997 part 2

1943 births
2010 deaths
20th-century English businesspeople
British conspiracy theorists
English stockbrokers
Pseudohistorians